Louisiana Wildlife Management Areas are protected conservation areas within the state of Louisiana. The goal is protecting, conserving, and replenishing wildlife, including all aquatic life. Wildlife Management Areas may be owned or managed by the Louisiana Department of Wildlife and Fisheries. The Enforcement Division ensures compliance of laws and rules and regulations regarding the management, conservation, protection of natural wildlife and fisheries resources, and providing public safety.

Ecoregions
Louisiana is divided into areas called ecoregions, West Gulf Coast Plain (WGCP) with 370,861 acres, East Gulf Coast Plain (EGCP) with 198,377 acres, Mississippi Alluvial Valley - North (MAVN) with 128,736 acres, and the Mississippi Alluvial Valley - South (MAVS) with 257,999 acres.

Wildlife Management Areas 
Louisiana Wildlife Management Areas:

Former WMA
The LDWF free-lease on the more than 25,000-acre Jackson - Bienville Wildlife Management Area (a WMA since 1961) was not renewed as of July 1, 2016, as an agreement with the Weyerhaeuser Company could not be reached. Nesting areas of the Red-cockaded woodpeckers are still subject to protection by the State of Louisiana and the LDWF under current laws and rules and regulations.

Georgia Pacific WMA
A 25,480-acre tract of land, bordered on the west by the Upper Ouachita National Wildlife Refuge, managed by the LDWF under a twenty-five year lease with tax exemptions that started in 1994, was removed as a WMA in 2003. The property, previously known as Terzia Game Preserve, under cooperative agreements with the state of Louisiana since 1935, was renamed Georgia Pacific WMA in 1966. Georgia Pacific Corporation transferred the property to a subsidy, The Timber Company, and the property was acquired by Plum Creek Timber Company during a 2001 merger. A local attorney brought a lawsuit in 2002 challenging the legality of a 1987 Legislative act (LSA-R.S. 56:24), that exempted local and state property taxes on corporate forest lands leased to the State for hunting by the public, that allegedly conflicts with Section 21 of Article 7 of the Louisiana Constitution. The lawsuit will likely have far reaching implications on land made available to the public that includes over 400,000 acres in Louisiana. With the potential loss of tax exemptions more property owners will likely not renew leases and many will opt to self-manage property pursuing other uses like leasing to hunting clubs, that have become a lucrative deal.

Conservation areas
White Lake Wetlands Conservation Area in Vermilion Parish

Wildlife refuges

References

 01
Wildlife Management Areas
Wildlife Management Areas
Wildlife management areas
Louisiana
Louisiana
Wildlife management areas
Louisiana